Paul Lewthwaite (born 1969 in Douglas, Isle of Man) is a sculptor working internationally, based in the UK. He produces sculptures for exhibition and public commission. His work is exhibited widely across the UK, Europe and the US. Lewthwaite is a Fellow of the Royal British Society of Sculptors.

Recent Commissions and Exhibitions

On Show at 108. One year display. Royal British Society of Sculptors, London, UK.
 USF Verftet. “B-Open”, Bergen, Norway.
'A Collection of Fragments', Geldards LLP, The Arc, Nottingham, UK.
'Transforming and Enabling', Wrightington Hospital, Wigan, UK. The John Charnley Trust.
'Montserrat Drawings' Espai Serrat, Barcelona, Spain, - solo exhibition.
Portico Gallery. “Amongst Forgotten Treasures”, Manchester, UK.
'RBS Centenary Exhibition', Harold Martin Botanic Gardens, Leicester, UK - group exhibition.
'A System of Support and Balance', Chesterfield Magistrates' Court, Derbyshire, UK.
'Mere Jelly at on the Wall', Olympia Grand Hall, London, UK - group exhibition.

Academic

Lewthwaite was an expert panelist at the "Nordic Material Playground" conference, at the Norwegian Centre for Design and Architecture, Oslo, Norway. He is a visiting artist at the Bergen National Academy of Art in Norway, and the Thomas Danby College in the UK.

Select bibliography

2007: "International Residency". Article. (a-n) Magazine, p. 21. February.
2002: Galeria Nela Alberca Publicity, Lapiz Revista Internacional de Arte, no 179/180, p. 193. 
2002: 'Lines of Connection', review, InmAdrid, p. 4 'Las Lineas Y Formas de Paul Frank', review, Metro 20 minutos Feb 21, p. 24
2001: Front cover (a-n) Magazine, February, Review p. 7, Article p. 34.

Robert Clark. Art critic for The Guardian. Mere Jelly catalogue. 2004.
Paul Frank Lewthwaite makes sculptures that make a fragmented poetic rather than coherent practical sense. Timber boxes open to reveal spray-painted MDF flat packs for the construction of not domestic shelves or furniture but what the artist calls “motifs of fragmentation”. Ship for the Sinking is a steel kit for a sea-going suicide. A Place of Blindness is a steel model house spray painted black with plywood boarded-up windows. Three Diaries: Hopes, Dreams, Desires is a set of three steel diary-sized locked safes. The mystifying strength of Lewthwaite’s work lies in its half-resemblance to quite ordinary things. Often made from DIY materials, these constructions look like they should be of some use, yet like a DIY joke, their use escapes us. A recent series of even more mysterious plywood sculptures were based on a combination of drawings done at Madrid’s Museo Arqueologico Nacional and reproductions taken from The War Illustrated publications 1940-1946. These are plywood semi-abstracts but again take on the significance of skeletal relics or fossilised remains. Then again they could be bits of furniture gone weird, furnishings from a DIY nightmare. Lewthwaite’s mock-domestic sculptures bring home the fact that an artwork is an immaculately crafted object that is of absolutely no use to anyone other than being its own deeply suggestive self.

External links
 Paul Lewthwaite official website
 Paul Lewthwaite at the Royal British Society of Sculptors

1969 births
Living people
British sculptors
British male sculptors
People associated with the University of Derby
Manx sculptors